Fulham was a borough constituency centred on the London district of Fulham.  It was represented in the House of Commons of the Parliament of the United Kingdom from 1885 until 1918 and from 1955 to 1997.

Between 1918 and 1955 it was divided into two constituencies, Fulham East and Fulham West. At the 1997 general election it was replaced by Hammersmith and Fulham.

History

Boundaries 
1885–1918: The parish of Fulham.

1955–1974: The Metropolitan Borough of Fulham wards of Hurlingham, Munster, Sands End, Town, and Walham.

1974–1983: The London Borough of Hammersmith wards of Avonmore, Colehill, Crabtree, Gibbs Green, Helford, Margravine, Parsons Green, Sandford, Sherbrooke, Sulivan, and Town.

1983–1997: The London Borough of Hammersmith and Fulham wards of Avonmore, Colehill, Crabtree, Eel Brook, Gibbs Green, Margravine, Normand, Palace, Sands End, Sherbrooke, Sulivan, Town, and Walham.

Members of Parliament

MPs 1885–1918

MPs 1955–1997

Elections

Elections in the 1880s

Elections in the 1890s

Elections in the 1900s

Elections in the 1910s

Elections in the 1950s

Elections in the 1960s

Elections in the 1970s

Elections in the 1980s

Elections in the 1990s

References 

 British Parliamentary Election Results 1885-1918, compiled and edited by F.W.S. Craig (Macmillan Press 1974)
 Debrett’s Illustrated Heraldic and Biographical House of Commons and the Judicial Bench 1886
 Debrett’s House of Commons and the Judicial Bench 1901
 Debrett’s House of Commons and the Judicial Bench 1918

Parliamentary constituencies in London (historic)
Constituencies of the Parliament of the United Kingdom established in 1885
Constituencies of the Parliament of the United Kingdom disestablished in 1918
Constituencies of the Parliament of the United Kingdom established in 1955
Constituencies of the Parliament of the United Kingdom disestablished in 1997
Fulham